Channel K is a Burmese digital Free-to-Air TV channel that run under MRTV's Multiplex Playout System based in Yangon, Myanmar.
Channel K is operated by KMA Group. They have signed a cooperation agreement with state-run Myanmar Radio and Television (MRTV) to operate as content providers for digital free-to-air TV channels in a multi-playout system of MRTV on 17 February 2018.

See also 
 Television in Myanmar

References

External links 
 Official website of Channel K

Television channels in Myanmar
Television channels and stations established in 2019
2019 establishments in Myanmar